Alur Limbat is a state constituency in Terengganu, Malaysia. It is currently represented in the Terengganu State Legislative Assembly.

History

References 

Terengganu state constituencies